Andrés Jiménez Aranzazu (born 9 March 2000) is an American soccer player who currently plays as a midfielder for Las Vegas Lights in the USL Championship.

Club career
Born 9 March 2000 in Miami, Florida, Jiménez started his career with Envigado in 2013. Jiménez was announced as a new signing for USL Championship side Las Vegas Lights on January 25, 2023.

Career statistics

Club

Notes

References

2000 births
Living people
Sportspeople from Miami
Soccer players from Florida
American people of Colombian descent
American soccer players
United States men's youth international soccer players
Association football midfielders
Categoría Primera A players
Envigado F.C. players
Las Vegas Lights FC players